The Most Serene Federal Republic of Montmartre (or the Serene Republic of Montmartre and Her Dependencies, or in brief the Republic of Montmartre) is either a micronation or an extended political satire. It is mostly within the boundaries of New York City's Manhattan.

Ca. 1965, Barry Alan Richmond (born ca. 1933), a stage actor/director, theatrical designer, and theatre promoter, author of articles on the Grand Guignol, proclaimed the Most Serene Federal Republic of Montmartre's existence and borders (mostly within Manhattan's theatre district, "roughly  39th to  59th Street with a strip up the Hudson River to where the  boat basin is, and from the middle of Fifth Avenue over to what international laws call the thalweg, which is the navigable channel in the middle of the Hudson River")... but set its origin at 1636. To some extent this may have been a piece of performance art in itself; but it exchanged mutual recognition with other such small organizations (micronations and governments-in-exile), and was acknowledged by the International Micropatrological Society. Richmond is named as its 47th president, among other titles.

On June 24, 1977, a New York state Public Service Commission hearing was held in the World Trade Center's South Tower to resolve a dispute between Richmond and New York Telephone, concerning the "Montmartre Govt of" listing in the blue-pages (government) section of the phone book, as depicted to the right. NYT wanted to remove that listing; Richmond wanted it kept. On June 29, Richmond sought an injunction in federal court to stop the removal; he didn't get one. On June 30, the PSC's hearing examiner ruled in favor of NYT, but on July 7 the PSC said that statement was "vacated". This dispute was reported before the hearings in  Mother Jones magazine, and the month after the hearings in the Los Angeles Times (on the front page) and New York Magazine.

On August 23, NYT began distributing new phone books, without the listing for Montmartre. Over two years later, in early December 1979, Richmond announced that the PSC had ruled in his favor and Montmartre's listing would be restored to the NYT phone book; news quoted an NYT spokesman complaining that this was "simply not fair".

In a January 2001 article for the Financial Times,  Mark Wallace reported: "These days, the government of Montmartre, in the person of the avuncular President Richmond, now in his mid-60s, is concentrating on a revival of the Montmartre national theatre, the Grand Guignol. Once a feature of French nightlife in the Parisian neighbourhood after which Richmond’s country is named, the rights to the comically grotesque theatre style now reside with the Montmartre chancery on East 70th Street, according to the president. Funding for the project is to come from the sale of Richmond’s vast collection of theatre and movie memorabilia, which includes original programmes from such films as Star Wars and Gone with the Wind." 

Richmond's trademark for "Grand-Guignol" was last renewed in May 2002, but expired in January 2016.

See also
Most Serene Republic — for the special meaning of "Most Serene" (="sovereign")

References

Montmartre
Micronations in the United States
Manhattan
Geography of Manhattan
Theater District, Manhattan